Simply Blood is an online blood donation platform which connects blood donors using its Android mobile applications and website. Simply Blood is world's first virtual blood donation platform having more than 10,000 registered users from more than 180 countries.

Founding 
Founded by Kiran Verma, Delhi, India in 2016 along with five college passouts from Ambala District, Haryana launched Simply Blood app on January 29, 2017, in Delhi. The founder of the platform is a school dropout and other were all software engineers passed out from the same college. Simply Blood was founded to solve the blood donation problem and curb black marketing of blood in India.

Mobile App 
Simply Blood has launched an Android mobile app (applications) only. The second version of the app was released by Vijay Goel, former Minister of Youth Affairs and Sports in India on September 23, 2017.

They have launched a realtime GPS enabled application which allows a person to raise a blood request without sharing the contact details in public and blood donors can see all the nearby blood requests near his/her current location to accept the blood request. After accepting the blood request the donor and requester will get each other's number in less than few seconds. Blood donors who wanted to donate blood on some specific date can register themselves and select a suitable date from the "Apps" to donate blood and save a life.

Achievements 
 Social Entrepreneur Award 2017

References 

 
 
 
 
 

Non-profit organisations based in India
Blood donation